Nauruan indigenous religion is an indigenous religion of the Nauruans.

Worldview
An offering to the female deity Eijebong was made. Dead spirits are believed to be invoked through trances by a medium, and those spirits were said to be living in the island of Buitani. Believers say that the sky and the earth were created by a spider called Areop-Enap.

Deities

Eigigu
Eigigu is a girl from nauruan mythology, who is said to be the wife of the moon (maramen).

Detora
Detora is a boy in nauruan mythology, who became the king of the sea.

Areop-Enap

Gaomodugudug
A figure in legend that exemplifies the role of frigate birds in nauru.

Eyouwit
A young girl who lived in the sky.

Decline
There are very few, if any, people on the island who still subscribe to this religion, because of the dominant belief of Christianity imposed upon them by Christian colonization.
Main sources for attestations of the religion in its old form comes from sources written by German ethnologist Paul Hambruch in 1914 and 1915, which was not well received by German missionary Alois Kayser.

See also 
 Indigenous religion

References

Nauruan mythology
Indigenous
Monotheistic religions